Branchville is a town in Orangeburg County, South Carolina, United States. The population was 1,024 at the 2010 census.

History
The community was so named because a railroad branch began at the town site.

Branchville, located on the southern tip of Orangeburg County, is home to the world's oldest railroad junction. The junction was built in 1828 and ran from Charleston to Branchville and was on the route of the country's first scheduled train. For more than a century, Branchville's economy was based on railroad passenger service.

The Southern Railway Passenger Depot was added to the National Register of Historic Places in 1973.

Geography
Branchville is located at  (33.252055, -80.817778).

Demographics

2020 census

As of the 2020 United States census, there were 998 people, 450 households, and 263 families residing in the town.

2000 census
As of the census of 2000, there were 1,083 people, 446 households, and 276 families residing in the town. The population density was 331.2 people per square mile (127.9/km2). There were 508 housing units at an average density of 155.3 per square mile (60.0/km2). The racial makeup of the town was 54.48% White, 43.12% African American, 0.18% Native American, 0.09% Asian, 1.11% from other races, and 1.02% from two or more races. Hispanic or Latino of any race were 1.39% of the population.

There were 446 households, out of which 27.8% had children under the age of 18 living with them, 41.7% were married couples living together, 16.6% had a female householder with no husband present, and 37.9% were non-families. 35.7% of all households were made up of individuals, and 15.5% had someone living alone who was 65 years of age or older. The average household size was 2.39 and the average family size was 3.12.

In the town, the population was spread out, with 26.3% under the age of 18, 9.1% from 18 to 24, 24.0% from 25 to 44, 24.6% from 45 to 64, and 16.0% who were 65 years of age or older. The median age was 38 years. For every 100 females, there were 84.2 males. For every 100 females age 18 and over, there were 72.7 males.

The median income for a household in the town was $22,429, and the median income for a family was $34,625. Males had a median income of $26,607 versus $20,917 for females. The per capita income for the town was $14,509. About 17.5% of families and 20.7% of the population were below the poverty line, including 27.8% of those under age 18 and 18.6% of those age 65 or over.

See also
Branchville and Bowman Railroad

References

External links
 Town Website 
 History of Branchville
 Info on Branchville
 Raylrode Daze Festivul Homepage
Webpage on Town of Branchville from Orangeburg County

Towns in Orangeburg County, South Carolina
Towns in South Carolina